Will Loconto is a musician, composer, and producer based in Austin, Texas. He is the lead vocalist/songwriter for the U.S. band T42, was a keyboardist for the band Information Society, and has composed music for various video game soundtracks including Daikatana.

Career
In 1989, Loconto replaced Jimron Goff as lead vocalist for the band T42, a Dallas area band that began in the Deep Ellum music scene in the late 1980s.

Loconto quit T42 in 1993 in order to be the keyboardist in the synth band Information Society.

Loconto left Information Society to work for Dallas-based computer game developer Ion Storm as a sound designer and composer. He was part of the initial design team for the game John Romero’s Daikatana. He left Ion Storm in November 1998 and co-founded PC and video game developer Third Law Interactive, distributed by publishing company Gathering of Developers the same year. Through Third Law Interactive, Loconto developed sound and music for Kiss: Psycho Circus: The Nightmare Child.

In 2001, he founded Will Loconto Music and Sound, and audio production company for games, television, and film.

T42 reunited in 2011 to release the album Voltage! and play several live shows. In August 2017, T42 released Hot On Top (Remastered), a remastered version of the 1989 cassette that led to their signing with Columbia Records. Decoder, their first new music since 1992 was released in October 2017. As of 2019, T42 is still playing live shows.

Honors, decorations, awards and distinctions

Credits

References

External links

Living people
American video game designers
Artists from Austin, Texas
American male composers
21st-century American composers
American music arrangers
21st-century American male musicians
Year of birth missing (living people)